The Herbie Mann–Sam Most Quintet (later reissued as The Mann with the Most) is an album by flautists Herbie Mann and Sam Most on the Bethlehem label which was recorded in 1955.

Reception

Allmusic awarded the album 4 stars noting "Most was actually the better known of the two flutists at the time but, while he ended up in the Los Angeles studios, Mann's constant musical curiosity would result in him gaining worldwide fame. Their enjoyable music finds the flutists battling it out to a draw". On All About Jazz Robert Spencer stated "The Herbie Mann-Sam Most Quintet is a 1956 album of eleven genial, high-spirited tracks featuring Mann and Most trading bright, up-tempo, virtually saxophonic flute solos".

Track listing 
 "Fascinating Rhythm" (George Gershwin, Ira Gershwin) - 3:49
 "Why Do I Love You?" (Oscar Hammerstein II, Jerome Kern) - 3:49
 "It's Only Sunshine" (Joe Puma) - 2:42
 "Love Letters" (Edward Heyman, Victor Young) - 2:11
 "Let's Get Away from It All" (Tom Adair, Matt Dennis) - 3:22
 "Flying Home" (Benny Goodman, Lionel Hampton) - 3:21
 "I'll Remember April" (Gene de Paul, Patricia Johnston, Don Raye) - 4:59
 "Empathy" (Sam Most) - 3:19
 "It Might as Well Be Spring" (Hammerstein, Richard Rodgers) - 3:13
 "Just One of Those Things" (Cole Porter) - 3:56
 "Seven Come Eleven" (Charlie Christian, Goodman) - 4:54

Personnel 
Herbie Mann, Sam Most - flute
Joe Puma - guitar
Jimmy Gannon - bass
Lee Kleinman - drums

References 

Herbie Mann albums
Sam Most albums
1956 albums
Bethlehem Records albums